Eriocaulon koernickianum, common names dwarf pipewort or gulf pipewort, is a plant species native to Oklahoma, Arkansas, Georgia and Texas. It occurs in moist, sandy acidic soils in seeps and bogs.

Eriocaulon koernickianum is an herb up to 8 cm (3.2 inches) tall, reproducing sexually and also by means of lateral vegetative shoots. Leaves are narrow, up to 5 cm (2 inches) long. Flowers are clustered into a head at the top of a long flowering stalk. Heads are up to 4 mm in diameter, gray to olive, lacking the ciliate hairs common in many other species of the genus.

References

koernickianum
Plants described in 1870
Flora of the United States